Harpalus remboides is a species of ground beetle in the subfamily Harpalinae. It was described by Solsky in 1874.

References

remboides
Beetles described in 1874